Soteska (literally, 'gorge') is a village in the Municipality of Kamnik in the Upper Carniola region of Slovenia. It lies in a side valley at the point where the Nevljica River exits the Tuhinj Valley through a gorge, from which it also gets its name. The main road from Kamnik into the Tuhinj Valley runs through the settlement.

References

External links

Soteska on Geopedia

Populated places in the Municipality of Kamnik